Diógenes da Silva Matthes (October 12, 1931 – November 20, 2016) was a Roman Catholic bishop.

Ordained to the priesthood in 1957, Matthes served as bishop of the Roman Catholic Diocese of Franca, Brazil from 1971 to 2006.

Notes

1931 births
2016 deaths
20th-century Roman Catholic bishops in Brazil
21st-century Roman Catholic bishops in Brazil
Roman Catholic bishops of Franca